Oe is a letter of related and vertically oriented alphabets used to write Mongolic and Tungusic languages.

Mongolian language 

Transliterated into Cyrillic with the letter .
  = an alternative final form; also used in loanwords.
 The syllable-initial medial form  is also used in non-initial syllables in proper name compounds, as well as in loanwords.
  = medial form used after the junction in a proper name compound.
 Derived from Old Uyghur waw, followed by a yodh in word-initial syllables, and preceded by an aleph for isolate and initial forms.
 Produced with  using the Windows Mongolian keyboard layout.
 In the Mongolian Unicode block,  comes after  and before .

Notes

References 

Articles containing Mongolian script text
Mongolic letters
Mongolic languages
Tungusic languages